is a Japanese voice actor from Tokyo, Japan. He is represented by Tokyo Actor's Consumer's Cooperative Society.

Biography

Filmography

Television animation
UFO Warrior Dai Apolon (1976) (Takeshi)
The Story of Perrine (1978) (Faburi)
Urusei Yatsura (1981) (Perm)
Combat Mecha Xabungle (1982) (El Condor)
Captain Tsubasa (1983) (Announcer)
Saint Seiya (1986) (Cerberus Dante)
Parasol Henbē (1989) (Megeru's father)
Moomin (1990) (Survey Committee Member)
Gambalist! Shun (1996) (Andreanof)
Keroro Gunso (2006) (Robo Camron)

OVA
Yōtōden (1987) (Narrator)
Legend of the Galactic Heroes (1989) (Focker Axel Von Büro)
The Silent Service (1995) (Koichiro Amatsu)

Theatrical animation
Ganbare!! Tabuchi-kun!! Movie Series  (1979-1980) (Announcer)
Mobile Suit Gundam: Encounters in Space (1982) (Cameron Bloom)
Mobile Suit Gundam: Char's Counterattack (1988) (Cameron Bloom)

Live action
Big Bird in Japan (1989)
H2 (1995-1996) - Announcer

Dubbing
Alien: Resurrection (TV edition) (Dr. Gediman (Brad Dourif))
All About Eve (South Korean television drama) (Seon-Dal (Pak Cheor))
The Big Brawl (Jug (Peter Marc Jacobson))
Die Hard (1992 Fuji TV edition) (Richard Thornburg (William Atherton))
Die Hard 2 (1992 Fuji TV edition) (Dick Thornburg (William Atherton))
Friday the 13th (1983 TV Asahi edition) (Jack Burrell (Kevin Bacon))
Ghostbusters (1987 Fuji TV edition) (Roger Delacorte (John Rothman))
Ghostbusters II (1992 Fuji TV edition) (Raymond Stantz (Dan Aykroyd))
Never Say Never Again (1985 Fuji TV edition) (Nigel Small-Fawcett (Rowan Atkinson))
The Simpsons (Sideshow Bob)
Swordfish (Gabriel Shear (John Travolta))
Taps (Cadet Captain Alex Dwyer (Sean Penn))
Thunderbirds Are Go and Thunderbird 6 (Virgil Tracy)
Time Bandits (1988 TV Asahi edition) (Robin Hood (John Cleese))

References

External links

1948 births
Living people
Japanese male video game actors
Japanese male voice actors
Male voice actors from Tokyo
Tokyo Actor's Consumer's Cooperative Society voice actors
20th-century Japanese male actors
21st-century Japanese male actors